Montmaurin is a commune in the Haute-Garonne department of southwestern France.

Montmaurin has one of the largest and most luxurious Gallo-Roman villas in France. It consisted of over 200 rooms, laid out around a string of three courtyards, and included among its architectural features a Gaulish temple, baths, interior gardens and mosaics which are still visible.

Population

See also
Communes of the Haute-Garonne department

References

Communes of Haute-Garonne